The Gizeldon ( or Гизель-Дон; , Džyzældon), is a river in North Ossetia–Alania just west of Vladikavkaz. It drains the northern slopes and glaciers of Mount Kazbek north to the Terek. A valley with many cliffs and a 4000-metre peak, the area is prone to avalanches; 30 were reported in 1967–1968. The terrain is described as having "craggy, gashed terrain", with cattle breeding, lumbering, and lead-zinc mining being the principal economic pursuits of the people of the Gizeldon valley. A hydroelectric plant has been built on the Gizeldon.

References

Rivers of North Ossetia–Alania
Valleys of Russia